Euprepius of Egypt was an Egyptian Orthodox Christian monk, ascetic, and saint who lived around the 4th century. All of his recorded sayings exist in the Sayings of the Desert Fathers, and little else is known about him.

Sayings 
All quotations from the Sayings of the Desert Fathers that are attributed to Euprepius of Egypt:

 "Knowing that God is faithful and mighty, have faith in him and you will share what is his. If you are depressed, you do not believe. We all believe that he is mighty and we believe all is possible to him. As for your own affairs, behave with faith in him about them, too, for he is able to work miracles in you also."
 "Bodily things are compounded of matter. He who loves the world loves occasions of falling. Therefore if we happen to lose something, we must accept this with joy and gratitude, realizing that we have been set free from care."
 A brother questioned Abba Euprepius about his life. And the old man said, "Eat straw, wear straw, sleep on straw: that is to say, despise everything and acquire for yourself a heart of iron."
 A brother asked the same old man, "How does the fear of God dwell in the soul?" The old man said, "If a man is possessed of humility and poverty, and if he does not judge others, the fear of God will come to him."
 "May fear, humility, lack of food and compunction be with you."

See also 
 Desert Fathers
 Or (monk)
 Anoub
 Lot (monk)
 Agathon (monk)

References

4th-century Egyptian people
5th-century Egyptian people
Egyptian Christian monks
Saints from Roman Egypt
Eastern Catholic saints
Coptic Orthodox saints
Desert Fathers
Eastern Orthodox saints